Virginia's 42nd House of Delegates district elects one of 100 seats in the Virginia House of Delegates, the lower house of the state's bicameral legislature. District 42, located in Fairfax County in northern Virginia, has been represented by Democrat Kathy Tran since 2018.

Electoral history

2017 
In 2017, Tran was first elected to a seat previously held by Republican Dave Albo, who was retiring. Tran was the first Asian American woman elected to House of Delegates and part of a wave of new Democratic women whose wins significantly increased the number of Democrats in the House.

References

External links
 

Government in Fairfax County, Virginia
Virginia House of Delegates districts